The Border is a Canadian drama series that originally aired on CBC Television. It follows several agents of a law enforcement agency known as the Immigration and Customs Security or ICS, created to deal with crimes that affect Canadian matters on border security. 38 episodes aired in Canada before an official cancellation was announced.

Series overview

Episodes

Season 1 (2008)
Season 1 had aired from January 7 to March 31 of 2008, airing 13 episodes. The following dates listed below are original Canadian air dates.

Season 1 begins when Mike Kessler, head of the fictional Canadian Immigration and Customs Security agency arrests a Syrian national named Tariq Haddad, a member of the fictional Jamaat-al-Takfir-al-Hijr in a sting operation with ICS agents. From there on, Cuban-American Homeland Security Bianca LaGarda gets posted at ICS headquarters in Toronto as a liaison officer.

Season 2 (2008)
Season 2 had aired its first episode on September 29, 2008, which aired on CBC Television with 13 episodes.

Season 3 (2009–10)
Season 3 had aired its first episode on October 8, 2009, which aired on CBC Television.

Season 3 begins with the aftermath of the events that occurred in the last episode of season 2. Kessler and Carver hover near death while Gray hunts down Layla’s killers. A bloody highway shoot-out with the crime mob in ‘Ndrangheta has left Major Kessler and Agent Carver fighting for their lives. The Squad is forced to the sidelines, as Special Counsel Louise Tilden investigates the role of ICS in the much-publicized tragedy. Meanwhile, Gray, who has been suspended from duty, sets out to avenge the murders of Layla and his father Dougie.

References

External links
 

Lists of Canadian drama television series episodes